Presidential elections were held in Benin on 5 March 2006. Long-term president Mathieu Kérékou, who had led the country for all but four years since 1972, was barred from running for a third term. The constitution not only stipulated an absolute two-term limit, but required presidents to be 70 years old or younger when taking office; Kérékou had turned 70 in 2003. In July 2005, Kérékou signalled that he would not seek to change the constitution, as has been done in some other African countries, so that he could run again. Kérékou's long-time rival Nicéphore Soglo was also barred from standing due to his age. 

With the men who had been among the country's leading political figures since the return of democracy barred from running, the campaign had a level of openness and unpredictability not common for African presidential elections. Since no candidate won a majority, a second round was held between the two leading candidates on 19 March; Yayi Boni won the election and took office in April.

Candidates
A total of 33 candidate applications were registered with the Autonomous National Electoral Commission (CENA). In a ruling issued on 30 January 2006, the Constitutional Court accepted 26 candidacies, as the candidacies of Daniel Shalom, Vincent Emmanuel Ahounou, and Adébayo Ananie were rejected because they were deemed medically unfit for the presidency, while the candidacies of Lary Egoundoukpè and Alidou Tamama were rejected because they had not paid the deposit of five million CFA francs required of candidates. Another two candidates, Edgar Alias and Yaro Sourakatou, withdrew in favor of Boni prior to the ruling. The approved candidates included three serving members of Kérékou's government: Zul Kifl Salami, Antoine Dayori, and Kamarou Fassassi. Additionally, the Constitutional Court approved the candidacies of two heads of major institutions: those of Antoine Idji Kolawolé, the President of the National Assembly, and Raphiou Toukourou, the President of the Economic and Social Council.

Results
In the first round, held on 5 March, Boni, former chairman of the West African Development Bank, placed first with around 35% of the vote, and former President of the National Assembly Adrien Houngbédji of the Democratic Renewal Party placed second with around 24% of the vote. In third place was the Social Democratic Party's candidate Bruno Amoussou, a former speaker of parliament and planning minister who obtained around 16% of the vote, and in fourth place was Benin Renaissance candidate Lehady Soglo, son of former president Nicéphore Soglo, with around 8% of the vote. Boni was an independent candidate, and this was his first election; Houngbédji and Amoussou had both run for president three previous times.

Shortly after results were announced in mid-March, the government set the date for the second round between Boni and Houngbédji for 19 March. The country's election commission asked for more time, but this was refused. Boni was backed for the second round by both Amoussou and Soglo. He won the second round with almost 75% of the vote and was sworn in on 6 April.

References

External links
Achieving Transformational Democracy in Africa: Benin strikes again USAID
Commission Electoral Nationale Autonome 
 

Presidential elections in Benin
Benin
Election
Benin